John Kaldor (born 1936) is an Australian art collector and philanthropist.

John Kaldor or Calder may also refer to:

 John Kaldor, a character in the 1996 novel Awake and Dreaming by Kit Pearson
 John Calder (1927–2018), Canadian and Scottish publisher
 John Calder (cricketer) (1951–2010), New Zealand cricketer
 John Calder (minister) (1733–1815), Scottish dissenting minister and author

See also 
 Jon Caldara, American libertarian activist
 John Calder Mackay (1920–2014), American post-war real estate developer